Dora Tchakounté (born 23 March 1995) is a French weightlifter borned in Yaoundé, Cameroon. She won the silver medal in the women's 59kg event at the 2021 European Weightlifting Championships held in Moscow, Russia. At the time, she won the bronze medal but in October 2021, this became the silver medal after original gold medalist Boyanka Kostova of Azerbaijan was banned for testing positive for traces of stanozolol. She also represented France at the 2020 Summer Olympics in Tokyo, Japan.

Career 

She competed in the women's 58kg event at the 2014 World Weightlifting Championships in Almaty, Kazakhstan and the 2015 World Weightlifting Championships in Houston, United States. She also competed in the women's 59kg event at the 2018 World Weightlifting Championships in Ashgabat, Turkmenistan and the 2019 World Weightlifting Championships in Pattaya, Thailand.

In 2021, she represented France at the 2020 Summer Olympics in Tokyo, Japan. She finished in 4th place in the women's 59kg event.

She competed in the women's 71kg event at the 2022 Mediterranean Games held in Oran, Algeria.

Major results

References

External links 
 

Living people
1995 births
French female weightlifters
European Weightlifting Championships medalists
Weightlifters at the 2020 Summer Olympics
Olympic weightlifters of France
People from Yaoundé
French sportspeople of Cameroonian descent
Naturalized citizens of France
Competitors at the 2022 Mediterranean Games
Mediterranean Games competitors for France
21st-century French women